Crater Cirque is a cirque on the south wall of Tucker Glacier, immediately west of its junction with Whitehall Glacier. In its floor is an attractive lake containing red and green algae, and in the surrounding rock walls there are nests of Wilson's petrels, skuas, and snow petrels, as well as running streams and growths of moss and lichens. It was given this descriptive name by the New Zealand Geological Survey Antarctic Expedition, 1957–58.

References
 

Cirques of Antarctica
Landforms of Victoria Land
Borchgrevink Coast